Khawaja Salman Rafique is a Pakistani politician who was a member of the Provincial Assembly of the Punjab, from April 2008 to March 2013, from September 2013 to May 2018 and from August 2018 to January 2023. He has served in Chief Minister Shehbaz Sharif's cabinet as Minister for Specialised Health and he also has served as Advisor and Special Assistant for Health. He also served as Minister in Chief Minister Hamza Shehbaz's Cabinet. He was one of the main key figures in handling dengue in 2010.

Early life and family
He was born on 16 February 1965.

He is younger brother of Khawaja Saad Rafique.His father Khawaja Muhammad Rafique Shaheed was a political activist and was assassinated, the family blames then Prime minister Zulfikar Ali Bhutto. His father has also worked for Fatima Jinnah. His mother was also elected member of Provincial Assembly of Punjab in 1985.

Political career
He was elected to the Provincial Assembly of the Punjab as a candidate of Pakistan Muslim League (N) (PML-N) from Constituency PP-142 (Lahore-VI) in 2008 Pakistani general election. He served as Special Assistant to Chief Minister of Punjab on Health.

He was re-elected to the Provincial Assembly of the Punjab as a candidate of PML-N from Constituency PP-142 (Lahore-VI) in by-elections held in August 2013. In November 2013, he briefly served as Special Assistant to Chief Minister of Punjab on Health. In November 2016, he was inducted into the provincial cabinet of Chief Minister Shahbaz Sharif and was made Provincial Minister of Punjab for Specialized Healthcare and Medical Education.

He was re-elected to Provincial Assembly of the Punjab as a candidate of PML-N from Constituency PP-157 (Lahore-XIV) in 2018 Pakistani general election.

References

Living people

1965 births
Pakistani people of Kashmiri descent
Punjab MPAs 2013–2018
Punjab MPAs 2008–2013
Pakistan Muslim League (N) MPAs (Punjab)
People from Lahore
Punjabi people
Punjab MPAs 2018–2023
Central Model School, Lahore alumni